Martin Štěpánek (11 January 1947 – 16 September 2010) was a Czech actor, journalist and politician. He joined Mirek Topolánek's First Cabinet as Culture Minister in September 2006, serving in the position until January 2007. He was the son of actor Zdeněk Štěpánek. He spent a significant part of his career working for Radio Free Europe. Štěpánek died in Prague in September 2010 due to suicide.

Filmography

References

External links 

Martin Štěpánek in Czech National Theater Archive
Martin Štěpánek on Filmová databáze (Film database)
 Martin Štěpánek on Česko-Slovenská filmová databáze (Czechoslovak film database)
 

1947 births
2010 deaths
Czechoslovak male film actors
20th-century Czech male actors
Male actors from Prague
Czech journalists
Culture ministers of the Czech Republic
Czech Freemasons
Czech male television actors
Civic Democratic Party (Czech Republic) Government ministers
2010 suicides
Suicides by firearm in the Czech Republic